The Sweet Breath of Life: A Poetic Narrative of the African-American Family is a 2004 photographic poetic narrative by Ntozake Shange and the photography collective Kamoinge Inc. The Kamoinge Workshop was founded in New York in 1963 to support the work of black photographers in a field then dominated by white photographers. The book was first published on October 26, 2004, through Atria Books and was edited by Frank Steward, the president of Kamoinge Inc.

Summary
The book depicts the various aspects of everyday urban African-American life through poetic narrative. Through poetic narrative and accompanying photographs, the book deals with various themes such as religion, identity, and representation.

Contributing photographers
Frank Stewart
Anthony Barboza
Adger Cowans
Gerald Cyrus
Louis Draper
Albert Fennar
Collette Fournier
James Francis
Steve Martin
Toni Parks
Herbert Randall
Eli Reed
Herb Robinson
Beuford Smith
Ming Smith
June Truesdale
Budd Williams

Reception
Critical reception for The Sweet Breath of Life has been positive and reviewers have compared the work to that of Langston Hughes and Roy DeCarava.

Black Issues Book Review judges some of the photos to be outdated and that some of the poems felt more like journalism than poetry,  but also that when the poems and photography worked together they were "powerfully made" and "breathtaking". Curve rated the book highly, citing the photography as one of the book's highlights. The Tri-State Defender praised the project as "a wonderful blend of words and images that give definition to the beauty and wonder of contemporary African-American culture."

References

External links 
 Ntozake Shange Papers, 1966-2016; Barnard Archives and Special Collections, Barnard Library, Barnard College.

American poetry collections
Narrative poems
2004 books
African-American cultural history
Works by Ntozake Shange
African-American literature
Literature by African-American women
Atria Publishing Group books